Xue Fei is the name of:

Xue Fei (host) (born 1960s?), Chinese TV host and educator
Xue Fei (footballer) (born 1987), Chinese association footballer
Xue Fei (runner) (born 1989), Chinese long-distance runner